Your Choice Live Series 025 is an album by The (International) Noise Conspiracy. It was recorded live at "Schlachthof" in Bremen the 16th of March 2002 and is the first full-length live album by The (International) Noise Conspiracy, produced by Tobby Holzinger. It has been released as a limited edition of 1000 LPs and 3000 CDs through Your Choice Records and was distributed through Cargo Records Germany.

Track listing

Dennis Lyxzén - The (International) Noise Conspiracy

External links
 The band's official on-line gateway.
 Live Pictures of TINC from 07.12.2008 in Switzerland from Poorboys on The Road
 Live Pictures Of T(I)NC
 Interview and live-videos at wenn's rockt! WebTV
 Your Choice Records
 Burning Heart Records
 Dennis and Inges' record label Ny Våg
 Lars and Ludwig talk about their favorite songs
 The (International) Noise Conspiracy's New Track "Arm Yourself"

The (International) Noise Conspiracy albums
Refused
2002 live albums

de:The (International) Noise Conspiracy
fr:The (International) Noise Conspiracy